On 21 January 1972, a McDonnell Douglas DC-9-32 registered as TC-JAC operated by Turkish Airlines crashed on approach while trying to make an emergency landing at Adana Airport. The aircraft was en-route from Kandara Airport in Jeddah, Saudi Arabia, to Ankara Esenboğa Airport with a stopover at Damascus Airport with only five crew members on board after carrying passengers to Hajj the day before.

After taking off from Damascus for the second leg of the flight, the plane had a cabin pressurization problem and attempted to divert to Adana. The aircraft had a go-around in its first landing attempt due to poor visibility. One of the five crew members died in the flames, while three others were injured.

Aircraft and crew 
The aircraft was a McDonnell Douglas DC-9-32 with serial number 47213/358, registered as TC-JAC and named Marmara after the region of Marmara; its first flight was in 1968. Two days prior to the crash, on 19 January, the plane carried the 13th Prime Minister of Turkey Nihat Erim and a delegation from Ankara to France, and was due to bring them back later on the accident day. Before the prime minister boarded the McDonnell Douglas DC-9, it underwent an "extensive technical control" and its interior was searched for explosives with detectors.

On board the aircraft was captain Mahzar İpek, co-pilot Celâlettin Yeprem and three cabin crew members: Nilgün Dener, Selva Aksöyek and Hülya Maviler. Maviler had also been a crew member on a Turkish Airlines flight that was hijacked to Sofia in September 1969.

Accident 

The aircraft was returning without passengers from Jeddah after carrying people to Hajj. The aircraft took off from Damascus and headed for Ankara. The pilots reported to controllers that they were having problems with cabin pressurization and diverted to Adana Airport for an emergency landing. It was snowing at the time of the accident, a condition which was rare for Adana. Due to the poor visibility, the pilots initiated a go-around after failing to see the runway. The plane lost its landing gear and slid a short distance before catching fire.

Wreckage and recovery 
The wreckage was located in a field near the Sarıhuğlar village close to the airport. Cabin crew member Hülya Maviler was killed in the fire that started after impact, while co-pilot Celâlettin Yeprem was taken out of the aircraft in a critical condition. Nilgün Dener survived without any injuries and helped fellow crew members evacuate. The crash is the sole fatal McDonnell Douglas DC-9 accident involving Turkish Airlines.

Cause and aftermath 
While being treated at the hospital, captain Mahzar İpek said that they had lost all communications with the airport and that they decided to make an emergency landing in an area that seemed to be flat.

In 1975, Gündüz Sevilgen, a member of the 15th Parliament of Turkey from the National Salvation Party, wrote several questions to the Grand National Assembly of Turkey related to Turkish Airlines, including the causes of accidents. He received a response from the Minister of Transport, Sabahattin Özbek, on 18 March. The response included a short list of causes of all Turkish Airlines crashes to date. The cause for the Adana crash in the response was:

According to a Hürriyet article from 1999, the pressurization failure was due to a wiring malfunction. In 2020, Sözcü reported that they could not find any record of the pilots being prosecuted over the death of Hülya Maviler.

References

Citations

Bibliography

External links 
 

Aviation accidents and incidents in 1972
Aviation accidents and incidents in Turkey
Turkish Airlines accidents and incidents
Turkish Airlines 1972 Adana
Turkish Airlines 1972
History of Adana Province
Turkish Airlines Adana 1972
January 1972 events in Europe